Stephen L. Golding (born 1944) is an emeritus professor of psychology at the University of Utah and a forensic psychologist who has written a large number of articles on the process of determining whether people are competent to stand trial.

Golding has a BA from the University of Arizona and a Ph.D. from the University of Oregon.  He was a professor at the University of Illinois at Urbana-Champaign from 1970–1985 and from 1985-2006 was a professor at the University of Utah.  He did post-doctoral research at UCLA and was a visiting professor at the University of South Florida.

Golding was a witness for the defense in Brian David Mitchell's federal competency hearing, arguing that Mitchell was delusional and wanted to be convicted making him unable to assist in his own defense.

Sources
Golding's vita

1944 births
University of Arizona alumni
University of Oregon alumni
Forensic psychologists
University of California, Los Angeles alumni
University of Illinois Urbana-Champaign faculty
University of South Florida faculty
University of Utah faculty
Living people